Byrrill Creek is a town located in the Tweed Shire, in north-eastern New South Wales, Australia.

References 

Suburbs of Tweed Heads, New South Wales